The Ulmarra Ferry is a cable ferry across the Clarence River in New South Wales, Australia. The ferry operates between the town of Ulmarra and Southgate.

The ferry is operated by a private sector operator under contract to Transport for NSW. The ferry operates on demand from 06:00 to 23:00, 7 days a week, with three 45 minute breaks during the day. It is closed for maintenance every Sunday from 06:00 to 08:00 and on the first Wednesday of each month from 09:30 to 11:30. If the ferry is not in operation, the alternatives are a  detour via the bridge at Grafton, or a  detour via the Lawrence Ferry.

References

External links
RMS vehicle ferry operation information

Ferries of New South Wales
Cable ferries in Australia